Acleris santacrucis is a species of moth of the family Tortricidae. It is found in North America, where it has been recorded from California.

The wingspan is about 14 mm. The forewings are ochreous with a silky gloss and brownish-ochreous reticulation. The hindwings are silky white, slightly yellowish at the apex. Adults have been recorded on wing from June to August and in October.

References

Moths described in 1963
santacrucis
Moths of North America